Melanoptilia nigra is a moth of the family Pterophoridae. It is known from Ecuador.

The wingspan is about 14 mm. Adults are on wing in September and December.

External links

Platyptiliini
Moths described in 2006
Taxa named by Cees Gielis
Moths of South America